Zavala Island is an ice-free island in the Dunbar group off the northwest coast of Varna Peninsula on Livingston Island in the South Shetland Islands, Antarctica.  It is extending , with surface area .  The area was visited by early 19th century sealers.

The island is named after the settlement of Zavala and the homonymous Zavala Mountain in western Bulgaria.

Location
Bulgarian topographic survey by the Tangra 2004/05 expedition. British mapping in 1968, Chilean in 1971, Argentine in 1980, and Bulgarian in 2005 and 2009.

Maps
 L.L. Ivanov. Antarctica: Livingston Island and Greenwich, Robert, Snow and Smith Islands. Scale 1:120000 topographic map. Troyan: Manfred Wörner Foundation, 2010.  (First edition 2009. )
 Antarctic Digital Database (ADD). Scale 1:250000 topographic map of Antarctica. Scientific Committee on Antarctic Research (SCAR). Since 1993, regularly upgraded and updated.
 L.L. Ivanov. Antarctica: Livingston Island and Smith Island. Scale 1:100000 topographic map. Manfred Wörner Foundation, 2017.

See also 
 Composite Gazetteer of Antarctica
 List of Antarctic islands south of 60° S
 SCAR
 Territorial claims in Antarctica

References

External links
 Zavala Island. SCAR Composite Antarctic Gazetteer
 Bulgarian Antarctic Gazetteer. Antarctic Place-names Commission. (details in Bulgarian, basic data in English)
 Zavala Island. Adjusted Copernix satellite image

Islands of Livingston Island
Bulgaria and the Antarctic